The 1874–75 season was the fourth season of competitive football in England.

National team
England and Scotland met again in a 2–2 draw at the Kennington Oval

Honours

References

External links